Zara Glover (born 24 January 1982 in Preston, Lancashire), is a ten-pin bowler. She is a world champion bowler and a bowling tutor for Brunswick Bowling Academies across Europe.

Achievements

2007 World Ranking Masters runner-up - Florida, U.S.
2006 San Marino Open Champion - second title defended successfully in 2006
2006 Indonesian Open Champion - title defended successfully
2005 European Ladies Masters Champion - Barcelona
2005 San Marino Open Champion
2005 Indonesian Open Champion - Jakarta
2005 World Games Singles silver medallist - Müllheim, Germany
2004 World Tenpin Team Cup gold medallist - Hoofddorp, Netherlands
2004 European Tenpin Team Cup gold medallist - Norwich, England
2004 Oltremare Naples Champion - Italy
2003 World Tenpin Team Cup gold medallist - Odense, Denmark
2003 Singles, Doubles and All-events World Champion - Kuala Lumpur, Malaysia
2002 World Youth Championships Team gold medallist - Pattaya, Thailand
2002 European Tenpin Team Cup Bronze medallist - Müllheim, Germany
2001 Trios European Champion and Masters silver medallist - Aalborg, Denmark
2000 World Youth Championships Doubles gold medallist - Santo Domingo, Dominican Republic

References

External links
Glover's website
Super Series profile

British ten-pin bowling players
1982 births
Living people
Sportspeople from Preston, Lancashire
Competitors at the 2009 World Games
World Games medalists in bowling
World Games silver medalists
21st-century British women